Peter Lloyd may refer to:

 Peter Lloyd (mountaineer) (1907–2003), British climber and engineer
 Peter Lloyd (aviator) (1920–2022), Australian sporting aviator and administrator
 Peter Lloyd (commentator) (1920–not later than 1976), British television football commentator
 Peter Lloyd (gymnast) (born 1949), Australian Olympic gymnast
 Sir Peter Lloyd (politician) (born 1937), British Conservative Party politician, Member of Parliament, 1979–2001
 Peter Lloyd (illustrator) (1944–2009), British-born American illustrator
 Peter Lloyd (journalist) (born 1966), foreign correspondent for the Australian Broadcasting Corporation
 Peter Lloyd (tennis), Australian tennis player